Eskdale School is a coeducational secondary school located in Whitby, North Yorkshire, England. The school is named after Eskdale, a valley that runs from Whitby to Westerdale.

It is a community school administered by North Yorkshire County Council. From September 2017 it became an 11 to 16 school. This has increased the capacity of the school from September 2018.

In February 2019 Eskdale School agreed to federate with nearby Caedmon College.

The school also has an astroturf pitch which is used by the school and the local community.

References

External links
Eskdale School official website

Secondary schools in North Yorkshire
Whitby
Community schools in North Yorkshire
Educational institutions with year of establishment missing